Michael Williams is an American author. He is known as an author of Dragonlance novels.

Biography
Williams was born and lives in Louisville, Kentucky. He has lived in Vermont, New York, New Jersey, Wisconsin, Ireland and England. Between 1983 and 1984, approximately 200 people left TSR as a result of mutilple rounds of layoffs; as a result Williams joined CEO John Rickets, as well as Mark Acres, Andria Hayday, Gaye Goldsberry O'Keefe, Gali Sanchez, Garry Spiegle, Carl Smith, and Stephen D. Sullivan in forming the game company Pacesetter on January 23, 1984. His first novel, Weasel's Luck, was published in 1988, followed by Galen Beknighted (1990), Arcady (1996), Allamanda (1997), Trajan's Arch (2010) and Vine: An Urban Legend (2012). His novel Dominic's Ghosts was published through Seventh Star Press in August 2018 followed by a re-issue of Vine: An Urban Legend in October 2018.

Novels

Original works

From Thief To King
 A Sorcerer's Apprentice (1990) – 
 A Forest Lord (1991) – 
 The Balance of Power (1992) –

City Quartet
 Trajan's Arch (2010) – 
 Vine: An Urban Legend (2012) – 
 Dominic's Ghosts (2018) – 
 Tattered Men (2019) –

Arcady
 Arcady (1996) – 
 Allamanda (1997) –

Franchise

Dragonlance novels
 Dragonlance Heroes Vol 3: Weasel's Luck (1988) – 
 Dragonlance Heroes Vol 3, II: Galen Beknighted (1990) – 
 Dragonlance Meetings 4: The Oath and the Measure (1992) – , sequel to the previous two novels.
 Dragonlance Villains Vol 1: Before the Mask (1993) –  
 Dragonlance Villains Vol 6: The Dark Queen (1994) –

References

External links
 

20th-century American male writers
20th-century American novelists
21st-century American male writers
21st-century American novelists
American fantasy writers
American male novelists
Living people
Novelists from Kentucky
Writers from Louisville, Kentucky
Year of birth missing (living people)